The Andrew McNally House in Altadena, California was the home of Andrew McNally (1838–1904), co-founder and president of the Rand McNally publishing company. The Queen Anne Style house is listed in the National Register of Historic Places.

McNally was an Irish immigrant who worked as a printer. When he came to the United States, he first worked for the Chicago Tribune when he met William Rand. Together they formed the company that bears their names. In 1880, McNally took his fortune and family and moved west They lived for a time in Pasadena, California before building their mansion in Altadena in 1887. The mansion is located on East Mariposa Street at Santa Rosa Avenue. McNally was a booster of the life in Altadena, and he convinced his friends to move here as well. They also built mansions along Mariposa, which soon began to be known locally as "Millionaire's Row".

McNally paid Pasadena architect Frederick Roehrig $15,000 to design the Victorian house. Facing south, away from the street, the house offered vistas of the Los Angeles Basin, the Pacific Ocean, and Santa Catalina Island. The house has a three-story rotunda that allows a view to the San Gabriel Mountains to the north. McNally also built a private rail spur from Altadena Junction to his property to store his private railroad car. The grounds were lavishly landscaped, with an aviary along Mariposa St. His gardener also looked after the deodar cedars that grew along Santa Rosa Avenue. These trees became Christmas Tree Lane, which is also listed in the National Register.

In 1904, McNally caught pneumonia while en route to his Windemere Ranch in La Mirada, California. (The ranch headquarters is also listed in the National Register.) He died shortly afterward. The gardens and aviary were neglected, some of the birds escaped. The property was then subdivided.

Notes

References
Peterson, Robert H. Altadena's Golden Years. Alhambra, California: Sinclair Printing and Litho, Inc., 1976.
Zack, Michele. Altadena: Between Wilderness and City. Altadena, California: Altadena Historical Society, 2004.

External links

Houses in Altadena, California
San Gabriel Valley
History of Los Angeles County, California
Houses on the National Register of Historic Places in California
Buildings and structures on the National Register of Historic Places in Los Angeles County, California
Victorian architecture in California
Queen Anne architecture in California
1887 establishments in California
Houses completed in 1887